Toulouse-Matabiau is the main railway station in Toulouse, southern France. It is in the city centre and connected to the Toulouse Metro. The station is situated on the Bordeaux–Sète railway, Toulouse–Bayonne railway, Brive–Toulouse (via Capdenac) railway and Toulouse–Auch railway. Direct trains run to most parts of France.

History

Toulouse waited until the middle of the 19th century for the railway to arrive in the city.

In 1853, Émile Pereire and his brother Jacob founded the CF du Midi. Three years later, the line from Bordeaux to Toulouse was opened, it was extended to Sète in 1857.

The current passenger building was built between 1903 and 1905, replacing an older and smaller building. The station took the name of the borough, an area called Matabiau, named after the martyrdom of Saint Saturnin, mata-bios meaning kill the bull. It was designed by Marius Toudoire (who also designed Bordeaux Station) and was built with stone from the Roman city of Saintes. Like the Midi station in Bordeaux, Matabiau station bears 26 coats of arms on the front of the building of the 26 destinations that Midi served.

Some work was carried out on the building in 1938 prior to its listing.

Layout
The station is centred on two main concourses at the front of the station directly linked to each other, with ticket offices, shops and cafés. Underpasses link these concourses to the platforms. The station is connected to the underground Marengo SNCF station on Line A of the Toulouse Metro, accessible from inside and just outside the station.

Destinations
Toulouse-Matabiau is situated at the heart of a six-branch star network of lines with both regional (TER) and national (TGV and Corail) services.

Toulouse is served by the following regional lines:
 Toulouse–Albi-Rodez
 Toulouse–Montauban
 Toulouse–Saint-Sulpice
 Toulouse–Carcassonne
 Toulouse–Tarbes and Bayonne
 Toulouse–Foix
 Toulouse–Auch

Several SNCF facilities are present near the station, including the old Toulouse-Raynal goods yard now a carriage and engine maintenance yard and the large Saint-Jory marshalling yard  to the north.

Train services
The following services currently call at Toulouse-Matabiau:

high-speed services (TGV)
Paris–Tours–Bordeaux–Toulouse
Toulouse–Montpellier–Lyon
intercity services (Intercités)
Paris–Vierzon–Limoges–Toulouse
Bordeaux–Toulouse–Montpellier–Marseille
Bayonne–Pau–Tarbes–Toulouse
night services (Intercités de Nuit)
Paris–Souillac-Toulouse
local service (TER Occitanie)
Toulouse–Carcassonne–Narbonne
Toulouse–Albi–Rodez
Toulouse–Figeac–Aurillac
Brive-la-Gaillarde–Cahors–Montauban–Toulouse
Montauban–Toulouse
Agen–Montauban–Toulouse
Toulouse–Castres–Mazamet
Toulouse–Castelnaudary–Carcassonne
Toulouse–Colomiers–Auch
Toulouse–Foix–Latour-de-Carol-Enveitg
Toulouse–Saint-Gaudens–Tarbes–Pau

Gallery

References

External links

 

Railway stations in Haute-Garonne
Transport in Toulouse
Buildings and structures in Toulouse
Railway stations in France opened in 1856
Railway stations in France opened in 1956